Giorgia Catarzi (born 15 June 2001) is an Italian professional racing cyclist, who currently rides for UCI Women's Continental Team .

References

External links
 

2001 births
Living people
Italian female cyclists
Place of birth missing (living people)
Cyclists from Florence